Robert Schlögl (born 23 February 1954 in Munich) is a German chemist known for research in catalysis. Currently, he is the Director and Scientific Member of the Fritz Haber Institute of the Max Planck Society in Berlin and the Max Planck Institute for Chemical Energy Conversion in Mülheim an der Ruhr.

Life and Work 
Schlögl studied chemistry at the University of Munich, where he received his bachelor's degree in 1979 and his doctorate in 1982. After postdoctoral studies at University of Cambridge under Sir John Meurig Thomas, at University of Basel under Hans-Joachim Güntherodt, and at the Fritz Haber Institute under Gerhard Ertl, he completed his Habilitation in Chemistry at the Technical University of Berlin in 1989. This was followed by a call to the University of Frankfurt as Professor of Inorganic Chemistry. Schlögl returned to Berlin and has been Director and Scientific Member of the Fritz Haber Institute since 1994. In 2011 he was also founding director at the Max Planck Institute for Chemical Energy Conversion.

Schlögl is a researcher in catalysis who has made crucial contributions to the elucidation of the structural dynamics and functionality of heterogeneous catalysts based on inorganic solids. The focus of his work is on the investigation of polycrystalline copper, molybdenum and vanadium oxides for selective oxidation.

Honors and awards 
Schlögl received numerous awards and distinctions. He was awarded the Otto Bayer Award and the Schunk Prize for innovative materials. In 2015 he received the Alwin Mittasch Prize, in 2017 the Ruhr Prize for Art and Science. For 2019 Schlögl was awarded the Eduard Rhein Prize. He is also a member of the Berlin-Brandenburg Academy of Sciences and honorary professor at Technical University of Berlin and Humboldt University of Berlin. Schlögl has been a member of the Leopoldina since 2011 and is a member of the German Academy of Engineering Sciences (Acatech).

Publications (selection) 

 als Herausgeber mit Jürgen Renn und Hans-Peter Zenner: Herausforderung Energie: ausgewählte Vorträge der 126. Versammlung der Gesellschaft Deutscher Naturforscher und Ärzte e.V., Berlin : Ed. Open Access 2011, .
 (Hrsg.): Chemical energy storage, Berlin; Boston, Mass.: De Gruyter 2013, .

External links 

 
 Homepage at Fritz-Haber-Institut der Max-Planck-Gesellschaft
 Biografische Daten bei Fritz-Haber-Institut der Max-Planck-Gesellschaft, Berlin
 Der Chemiker Robert Schlögl will mit Spitzenforschung das deutsche Energieproblem lösen
 Reaktionspotenzial, Interview mit Maria Andrea Mroginski und Robert Schlögl

References 

1954 births
Academic staff of Goethe University Frankfurt
Academic staff of the Technical University of Berlin
20th-century German chemists
Living people
Max Planck Society people
Ludwig Maximilian University of Munich alumni
Hoffmann-La Roche people
German physical chemists
Members of the German Academy of Sciences Leopoldina
Max Planck Institute directors